Selects is an album by Indian tabla musician Zakir Hussain. It was released on the Moment Records label in 2002.

Track listing

Personnel
Zakir Hussain - Tabla

References

2002 albums
ECM Records albums
Zakir Hussain (musician) albums